In the mathematical field of graph theory, the triangle graph is a planar undirected graph with 3 vertices and 3 edges, in the form of a triangle.

The triangle graph is also known as the cycle graph  and the complete graph .

Properties 
The triangle graph has chromatic number 3, chromatic index 3, radius 1, diameter 1 and girth 3. It is also a 2-vertex-connected graph and a 2-edge-connected graph.

Its chromatic polynomial is

See also
 Triangle-free graph

References 

Individual graphs
Regular graphs